George Clark Miller (9 January 1882 – 17 March 1968) was the 23rd mayor of Vancouver, British Columbia from 1937 to 1938. He was born in Huron County, Ontario, moving to Manitoba, then in 1941 to Vancouver.

Gerald McGeer left the mayor's position when he became a member of the House of Commons of Canada. Miller, a city alderman, won the 9 December 1936 city election which featured the first candidates of the Non-Partisan Association. After two years as Vancouver's top local politician, Miller was defeated by James Lyle Telford.

In 1952, Miller was elected to the British Columbia Legislative Assembly representing Vancouver—Point Grey representing the Progressive Conservative Party of British Columbia, but was defeated the next year in the 1953 provincial election.

References

External links
Vancouver History: list of mayors, accessed 24 August 2006

1882 births
1968 deaths
Mayors of Vancouver
British Columbia Conservative Party MLAs
People from Huron County, Ontario
20th-century Canadian politicians